In complex geometry, the  lemma (pronounced ddbar lemma) is a mathematical lemma about the de Rham cohomology class of a complex differential form. The -lemma is a result of Hodge theory and the Kähler identities on a compact Kähler manifold. Sometimes it is also known as the -lemma, due to the use of a related operator , with the relation between the two operators being  and so .

Statement

ddbar potential

This lemma should be compared to the notion of an exact differential form in de Rham cohomology. Indeed, since the Dolbeault operators sum to give the exterior derivative  and square to give zero , the -lemma implies that , refining the -potential to the -potential in the setting of compact Kähler manifolds.

Proof 
The -lemma is a consequence of Hodge theory applied to a compact Kähler manifold.

The Hodge theorem for an elliptic complex may be applied to any of the operators  and respectively to their Laplace operators . To these operators one can define spaces of harmonic differential forms given by the kernels:

The Hodge decomposition theorem asserts that there are three orthogonal decompositions associated to these spaces of harmonic forms, given by

These decompositions hold separately on any compact complex manifold. In particular on a compact Kähler manifold

which implies an orthogonal decomposition

As a result of the above decompositions, one can prove the following lemma.

The proof is as follows. Let  be a closed (p,q)-form on a compact Kähler manifold . It follows quickly that (d) implies (a), (b), and (c). Moreover, the orthogonal decompositions above imply that any of (a), (b), or (c) imply (e). Therefore, the main difficulty is to show that (e) implies (d).

To that end, suppose that  is orthogonal to the subspace . Then .

Thus it is the case that . This allows us to write  for some differential form .

The equality  implies that  is also -harmonic and therefore . Thus . However, since  is -closed, it is also -closed. Then using a similar trick to above,

also applying the Kähler identity that . Thus  and setting  produces the -potential.

Local version 
A local version of the -lemma holds and can be proven without the need to appeal to the Hodge decomposition theorem. It is the analogue of the Poincaré lemma or Dolbeault–Grothendieck lemma for the  operator. The local -lemma holds over any domain on which the aforementioned lemmas hold.

The proof follows quickly from the aforementioned lemmas. On the other hand, suppose  is -closed. Then by the Poincaré lemma there exists an open neighbourhood  of any point  and a form  such that . Noting then that  this completes the proof as  where .

Bott–Chern cohomology 
In particular when a compact complex manifold is a Kähler manifold, the Bott–Chern cohomology is isomorphic to the Dolbeault cohomology, but in general it contains more information.

The Bott–Chern cohomology groups of a compact complex manifold are defined by

Since a differential form which is both  and -closed is -closed, there is a natural map  from Bott–Chern cohomology groups to de Rham cohomology groups. When the manifold  satisfies the -lemma, for example if it is a compact Kähler manifold, then the above maps from Bott–Chern cohomology to Dolbeault cohomology are isomorphisms, and furthermore the map from Bott–Chern cohomology to de Rham cohomology is injective. As a consequence, there is an isomorphism

whenever  satisfies the -lemma.

Consequences for bidegree (1,1)
The most significant consequence of the -lemma occurs when the complex differential form has bidegree (1,1). In this case the lemma states that an exact differential form  has a -potential given by a smooth function :

In particular this occurs in the case where  is a Kähler form restricted to a small open subset  of a Kähler manifold (this case follows from the local version of the lemma), where the aforementioned Poincaré lemma ensures that it is an exact differential form. This leads to the notion of a Kähler potential, a locally defined function which completely specifies the Kähler form. Another important case is when  is the difference of two Kähler forms which are in the same de Rham cohomology class . In this case  in de Rham cohomology so the -lemma applies. By allowing (differences of) Kähler forms to be completely described using a single function, which is automatically a plurisubharmonic function, the study of compact Kähler manifolds can be undertaken using techniques of pluripotential theory, for which many analytical tools are available. For example, the -lemma is used to rephrase the Kähler–Einstein equation in terms of potentials, transforming it into a complex Monge–Ampère equation for the Kähler potential.

ddbar manifolds
Complex manifolds which are not necessarily Kähler but still happen to satisfy the -lemma are known as -manifolds. For example, compact complex manifolds which are Fujiki class C satisfy the -lemma but are not necessarily Kähler.

See also 
 Poincaré lemma
 Dolbeault–Grothendieck lemma

References

External link 

Hodge theory
Complex manifolds